The Abitibi-Témiscamingue International Film Festival (FCIAT) is an annual film festival, which takes place in Rouyn-Noranda, Quebec, Canada. The festival presents a program of Canadian and international films in late October and early November each year.

The festival was launched in 1982. It was an expansion of the Semaine du cinéma régional, a festival launched in 1977 which concentrated exclusively on films made in the Abitibi-Témiscamingue region.

Festival programmer Anne-France Thibault has compared it to the Cinéfest Sudbury International Film Festival, in that both festivals became popular cultural events and important stops on the Canadian film festival circuit despite having been launched in blue-collar mining communities removed from Canada's traditional cultural meccas.

While the COVID-19 pandemic in Canada forced nearly all other Canadian film festivals to either cancel their 2020 programs or shift to an online streaming model, the Abitibi-Témiscamingue region's very low rate of COVID-19 cases made it one of the few film festivals in the country that was able to hold physical screenings. Despite the reduced risk, social distancing protocols, including mandatory masks, sanitizer stations and reduced audience sizes, were still maintained for audience safety.

Awards

Grand Prix Hydro-Québec
The Grand Prix Hydro-Québec is presented to the film that was voted the most popular by audiences.

Prix Bell
The Prix Bell, formerly the Télébec Prize, is a juried award presented to a film judged as the best short film of the festival.

Télé-Québec Volet Espace Court Prize
The Télé-Québec Volet Espace Court Prize is an audience award presented to the short film by a Quebec director voted most popular with audiences.

TVA Animation Prize
The TVA Animation Prize is an audience award presented to the most popular animated film. The award is most commonly given to shorts, but animated feature films are also eligible if screened at the festival.

Médiafilm Robert-Claude Bérubé Prize
The Médiafilm Robert-Claude Bérubé Prize is presented to a film distinguished by themes of moral, social and ethical values.

Prix SPIRA
The Prix SPIRA, presented for the first time in 2019, is a juried award for short films, whose prize from the SPIRA filmmaking cooperative is $10,000 in equipment and post-production services toward a future project.

Relève Desjardins
The Relève Desjardins is a $2,000 bursary presented for short local films made by students at the Cégep de l'Abitibi-Témiscamingue and the Université du Québec en Abitibi-Témiscamingue.

Prix Fonds Bell

Prix Unis TV

References

External links

Film festivals in Quebec
Film festivals established in 1982
Rouyn-Noranda
1982 establishments in Quebec